Guion Griffis Johnson (12 April 1900 – 12 June 1989) was an American historian.

Life
Born Frances Guion Griffis in Wolfe City, Texas, on April 11, 1900, she was raised in Greenville, Texas. She married Guy Benton Johnson, a sociologist, and together they had two sons, Guy Benton, Jr. and Edward. She died at the age of 89 on 12 June 1989.

Academic career
She attended Baylor College for Women and began studying journalism. After marriage,  her husband and she moved from Texas to take  positions at the University of North Carolina at Chapel Hill. There, she was offered an associate professorship and earned her PhD in history.

Because so few women were active historians at the time, Johnson's first mention in the American Historical Review referred to her as "he". She published several studies of the antebellum South, delving into race relations, religion, freed slaves, women's life, and other aspects that had previously been only lightly treated. Her award-winning book Ante-Bellum North Carolina: A Social History is still considered an important resource.

She became involved in women's organizations and issues after the end of the Second World War, when opportunities for women again became limited. She and her husband and also collaborated on several research projects.

References

External links

University of North Carolina at Chapel Hill alumni
University of North Carolina at Chapel Hill faculty
Historians of the United States
People from Greenville, Texas
1989 deaths
1900 births
20th-century American historians
20th-century American male writers
People from Wolfe City, Texas
Historians from Texas
American male non-fiction writers